Fujiwara no Michikane (藤原 道兼; 961 – June 13, 995), the son of Kaneie, was a Japanese nobleman and monk of the Heian period.

When his nephew took the throne as Emperor Ichijō in 994, he returned from monastic life and took the government position of Udaijin (Minister of the Right). The following year, he succeeded his brother Michitaka as imperial regent (Kampaku).

Michikane died a week after assuming the regency, and is thus sometimes referred to as Nanoka no Kampaku (七日の関白), or "the seven-days regent." He was then replaced by his brother Michinaga.

The Rusu clan claimed descent from Michikane.

He was the father of Fujiwara no Kanetaka and Fujiwara no Sonshi.

References
Papinot, Edmond (1910). Historical and geographical dictionary of Japan. Tokyo: Librarie Sansaisha.

961 births
995 deaths
Fujiwara clan
Regents of Japan